Albert Aleksandrovich Pakeyev, or Albert Pakeev, (born July 4, 1968) is a boxer from Russia who won the bronze medal in the Men's Flyweight (– 51 kg) division at the 1996 Summer Olympics in Atlanta, United States. He won the title at the 1996 European Amateur Boxing Championships in Vejle, Denmark.

Olympic results 
Defeated Richard Sunee (Mauritius) 8-1
Defeated Borniface Muluka (Zambia) 13-4
Defeated Daniel Reyes (Colombia) 13-13
Lost to Maikro Romero (Cuba) 6-12

References
 databaseOlympics.com
 

1968 births
Living people
People from Usolye-Sibirskoye
Flyweight boxers
Boxers at the 1996 Summer Olympics
Olympic boxers of Russia
Olympic bronze medalists for Russia
Olympic medalists in boxing
Russian male boxers
Medalists at the 1996 Summer Olympics
Sportspeople from Irkutsk Oblast